Brett Doyle (born 30 Aug 1972) in Newmarket, England is a flat race jockey. Doyle has ridden 147 winners in Hong Kong across a number of stints. He rode 18 winners in the 2010/11 season in which his best partnership was with Thumbs Up for a triumph in the HKG3 Mission Hills Sha Tin Trophy in October 2010.

Major Wins
Sussex Stakes - Sayyedati (1995)
Premier Cup, HKG3 - Joy And Fun (2009)
Mission Hills Sha Tin Trophy, HKG3 - Packing Winner (2010)
G3 Al Quoz Sprint - Joy And Fun (2010)

Performance

References

The Hong Kong Jockey Club 

Hong Kong jockeys
Living people
1984 births